Aspergillus purpureus is a species of fungus in the genus Aspergillus. It is from the Nidulantes section. The species was first described in 1975. It has been isolated from soil in Egypt. It has been reported to produce emindol SA, emindol SB, emindol SC, epurpurin A-C, sterigmatocystin, variecolactone, variecolin, and variecolol.

Growth and morphology

A. purpureus has been cultivated on both Czapek yeast extract agar (CYA) plates and Malt Extract Agar Oxoid® (MEAOX) plates. The growth morphology of the colonies can be seen in the pictures below.

References 

purpureus
Fungi described in 1975